Vente Venezuela is a classical liberal political party in Venezuela headquartered in the city of Caracas. It has parliamentary representation in the National Assembly. Its registration as a political party has not been granted by the National Electoral Council.

Political ideology 
According to Vente Venezuela, the group "appeals to the principles of democrats and republicans" and "breaks from the traditional argument between the left and right".

References

External links
Official website

Political parties in Venezuela
Liberal parties in Venezuela
Classical liberal parties